Ballydown is a townland of 210 acres in County Antrim, Northern Ireland. It is situated in the civil parish of Islandmagee and the historic barony of Belfast Lower.

Archaeology
The townland contains a mound (at grid ref: D4364 0061) which is a Scheduled Historic Monument.

See also 
List of townlands in County Antrim

References

Townlands of County Antrim
Civil parish of Island Magee